Triplosperma is a genus of plants in the  Apocynaceae, first described as a genus in 1838. It contains only one known species, Triplosperma cochinchinensis, native to Indochina.

References

Asclepiadoideae
Monotypic Apocynaceae genera